Erased may refer to:

 "Erased", a 2002 song by Paradise Lost from Symbol of Life
 "Erased", a 2009 song by Dead by April from Dead by April
 Erased (manga), a 2012 Japanese manga series by Kei Sanbe which received an anime television adaptation in 2016 and a live-action television adaptation in 2017
 Erased (2012 film), an action-thriller film directed by Philipp Stölzl
 Erased (2016 film), the 2016 Japanese live-action film based on the manga
 Erased (2018 film), a Slovenian drama film directed by Miha Mazzini
 Erased (heraldry), a blazonry term
 The Erased, a term for people in Slovenia without legal citizenship status

See also
 Erase (disambiguation)